Corvi-Mora is a contemporary art gallery based in Kennington, South London. The gallery represents emerging and established international artists including Turner Prize nominees Roger Hiorns and Lynette Yiadom-Boakye.

History
Corvi-Mora was founded by Tommaso Corvi-Mora in 2000 at premises in London's Warren Street after the closure of the gallery Robert Prime which he founded in partnership with Gregorio Magnani in 1995. Corvi-Mora moved to a space on Kempsford Road in 2004 with the contemporary art gallery greengrassi.

Notable exhibitions include Sorrow for A Cipher by Lynette Yiadom-Boakye in 2016, Roger Hiorns in 2004 and 2015, The Commune Itself Becomes a Super State by Liam Gillick in 2007, Rachel Feinstein in 2007, and Richard Hawkins in 2009.

The gallery currently represents over 30 artists, including Dominique Gonzalez-Foerster, Lynette Yiadom-Boakye, Alvaro Barrington, Jennifer Packer, Brian Calvin and Tomoaki Suzuki.

References

External links
 

Contemporary art galleries in London
Art galleries established in 2000
2000 establishments in England
Italian art dealers